Martin I may refer to:

 Pope Martin I (c. 590/600–655), bishop of Rome 649–655
 Martin I (bishop of Oviedo) (died 1101)
 Martin I (archbishop of Gniezno) (died after 1112)
 Martin I of Aragon (1356–1410)
 Martin I of Sicily (1374/6–1409)
 Martin, Count of Ribagorza (r. 1533–1565 and 1573–1581), see County of Ribagorza

See also
 Saint Martin (disambiguation)
 San Martín (disambiguation)

Human name disambiguation pages